Zero Point railway station is the eastern terminus of the Hyderabad–Khokhrapar Branch Line. The station was constructed in February 2006 when Mirpur Khas–Munabao  railway was converted to the present day . The station is used for immigration and customs of passengers who travel on the Thar Express between Pakistan and India.

Services

See also
 Pakistan Railways
 Munabao railway station

References

External links 

 Google Map
 The Meter-Gauge of Sindh

Railway stations in Umerkot District
Railway stations opened in 2006
Railway stations on Hyderabad–Khokhrapar Branch Line